Chelgerd (also Romanized as Chelgard) is a city in the Central District of Kuhrang County, Chaharmahal and Bakhtiari province, Iran, and serves as capital of the county. At the 2006 census, its population was 2,708 in 539 households. The following census in 2011 counted 3,061 people in 596 households. The latest census in 2016 showed a population of 2,989 people in 753 households. The city is populated by Lurs.

References 

Kuhrang County

Cities in Chaharmahal and Bakhtiari Province

Populated places in Chaharmahal and Bakhtiari Province

Populated places in Kuhrang County

Luri settlements in Chaharmahal and Bakhtiari Province